Margery Daw may refer to:

 "See Saw Margery Daw", a nursery rhyme
 Margery Daw (Shakugan no Shana), a character in the light-novel series Shakugan no Shana (2002- )
 Margery Daw, character from the 1881 comic operetta Uncle Samuel 
 Saint Margery Daw, Cornish folk tale; collected in Peter and the Piskies: Cornish Folk and Fairy Tales
Margey Daw (1916), a play by George D. Parker

See also
Marjorie Daw (disambiguation)
Marjorie Dawes, fictional character in Little Britain